Sawdust in My Veins is the debut solo studio album by Scottish singer-songwriter James Grant, released in the UK by Survival Records on 27 April 1998. The album reached number 42 in the Scottish Albums Chart.

A single, "Pray the Dawn", was released in the UK on 6 April 1998. The album was released in the US by Valley Entertainment on 26 September 2000.

Background
In a 1998 interview with Teletext, Grant said in response to the suggestion that the album is full of "melancholy ballads", "I don't mean to be miserable; it's just how the songs come out really. I didn't plan them that way. It's more a stream of consciousness, I suppose."

Critical reception

On its release, Stuart Maconie, writing for Q, stated that "lovers of craft will delight in this, with its elegant memories, and seductive chord changes". He praised the "excellent arrangements" of Grant's "splendid voice and guitar" in front of "subtle strings and unobtrusive backing". He concluded, "Grant's pop star chances may have evaporated, but it's a callous world if that blinds us to these fine songs." James McNair of Mojo felt the album showed Grant's songwriting "at its zenith", adding that his "Scott Walker-deep voice [has] matured to perfection and his guitar playing as tasteful as ever". He felt the production was "a little dated in places", but added that fans of Grant's previous work will "love this record".

Tom Ferguson of Music & Media felt Grant had "finally made the album his admirers always believed he was capable of" and praised it as an "impeccably played and sung set". He felt some of the album was reminiscent of "the silky Steely Dan-isms" of Love and Money, but added that "Grant's first solo outing is a more personal, mature work". He added that many of the tracks "wouldn't sound out of place on AC-leaning radio formats". Colin Larkin, in his Encyclopedia of Popular Music, praised it as a "strong solo set".

Track listing

Personnel
Credits are adapted from the Sawdust in My Veins CD booklet.

 James Grant – vocals, acoustic guitar, electric guitar, bass
 Donald Shaw – keyboards, accordion
 James Mackintosh – drums, percussion
 Fraser Speirs – harmonica
 The BT Scottish Ensemble – strings
 Karen Matheson – backing vocals
 Kevin McCrae – arrangement
 Wilf Taylor – shaker (track 3)
 Marc Duff – whistle (track 3)
 AJ Nugent – backing vocals (track 4)
 Gwen Stewart – backing vocals (track 8)

Production
 Donald Shaw – producer
 Grant Milne – engineer
 Paul McGeechan – additional programming
 Stuart Hamilton – string recording
 Calum Malcolm – mixing, mastering

Other
 Tank Design – design
 Craig Mackay – photography

Charts

References

1998 debut albums
James Grant (musician) albums
Valley Entertainment albums